Chapuq (also Romanized as Chāpūq; also known as Chapykh and Chūpāq) is a village in Golabar Rural District, in the Central District of Ijrud County, Zanjan Province, Iran. At the 2006 census, its population was 592, in 144 families.

References 

Populated places in Ijrud County